Sergei Tsarayevich Dzodziyev (born 30 June 1980) is a Russian former professional football player.

External links
 
 

1980 births
Living people
Russian footballers
Association football forwards
Russian expatriate footballers
Expatriate footballers in Ukraine
FC Tobol Kurgan players
FC Khimik-Arsenal players
FC Volga Nizhny Novgorod players
FC Lada-Tolyatti players
FC Sokol Saratov players
FC Spartak Kostroma players
FC Rubin Yalta players
Crimean Premier League players
FC Volga Ulyanovsk players